"Stay the Same" is a song by British singer-songwriter Gabrielle. It was written by Gabrielle, Richard Stannard, Julian Gallagher, Ferdy Unger-Hamilton, and Dave Morgan, and produced by Stannard, Gallagher, and Unger-Hamilton for her fourth studio album Play to Win (2004). Selected as the album's lead single, it peaked at number 20 on the UK Singles Chart, number 47 on the Irish Singles Chart, and number 55 on the Romanian Top 100.

Track listings

Credits and personnel
Credits are taken from the UK CD single liner notes.

 Gabrielle – writing, vocals
 Richard "Biff" Stannard – writing, background vocals, production
 Julian Gallagher – writing, guitar, production
 Ferdy Unger-Hamilton – writing, production
 Dave Morgan – writing, guitar
 Sharon Murphy – background vocals
 Anthony Drennan – guitar

 Derrick Taylor – bass guitar
 Dylan Howe – drums
 Simon Hale – keyboards
 Mark "Spike" Stent – mixing
 Paul "Pdub" Walton – mixing
 David Treahearn – mixing
 Alvin Sweeney – recording, programming

Charts

References

2004 singles
2004 songs
Gabrielle (singer) songs
Go! Beat singles
Music videos directed by Mike Lipscombe
Song recordings produced by Richard Stannard (songwriter)
Songs written by Gabrielle (singer)
Songs written by Julian Gallagher
Songs written by Richard Stannard (songwriter)